Golden orchid is a common name for several plants and may refer to:

Cephalanthera falcata, native to Japan, Korea, and China
Dendrobium discolor, native to northern Australia, New Guinea, and Indonesia